Muness Castle is located on Unst, which is one of the Shetland Islands of Scotland. Unst is Scotland's most northerly inhabited island, and Muness is the most northerly fortalice in the British Isles. It was designated as a Scheduled monument in 1953 and is run as a museum by Historic Environment Scotland.

History
The castle was built in 1598 for Laurence Bruce of Cultmalindie, half-brother to Robert Stewart, 1st Earl of Orkney. Earl Robert was succeeded by his son Patrick in 1593. The building may have been constructed under the direction of Andrew Crawford, Earl Patrick's master of works, who also oversaw the construction of Scalloway Castle and the Earl's Palace at Kirkwall, Orkney. Bruce gave the castle to his son Andrew in 1617. It was burnt by foreign privateers in August 1627, and may never have been fully repaired. It was abandoned before the end of the century and it was sold out of the family in 1718. The castle is now roofless and missing its upper storey which was removed to build the surrounding boundary wall. Aerial photographs reveal the possible presence of a formal garden to the south-west of the castle.

Description
The castle forms a rectangular block  with circular towers at the north and south angles. The ground floor and first storey survive virtually intact and the corbelling supports for small turrets on the east and west corners on the second storey remain. The roof was probably gabled and the towers likely had conical roofs. The entrance is located on the south-western side and is covered by gun loops in the main block and in the south-eastern tower.

References

Bibliography

External links 
Historic Environment Scotland: Visitor guide 

Buildings and structures completed in 1598
Castles in Shetland
Scheduled Ancient Monuments in Shetland
Historic Scotland properties in Shetland
Unst